Doris Buchanan Smith (June 1, 1934 – August 8, 2002) was an American author of award-winning Children's books, including A Taste of Blackberries (HarperCollins, 1973).

Works 

Doris Buchanan Smith's, A Taste of Blackberries (HarperCollins, 1973), earned critical acclaim as well as comparisons with Charlotte's Web (HarperCollins, 1952).  In the early 1970s, along with authors such as Katherine Paterson and Judy Blume, Smith established "a solid reputation for accessible fiction with serious themes."  A Taste of Blackberries "deals honestly and emphatically with the range of emotions," wrote Cynthia Westway in The Atlanta Journal, 1973, "... the story is not, however an elegy; but a celebration of the continuity of the life-death cycle." David Rees, in The Times Literary Supplement, 1975,  declared, "It will be difficult to find a children's book this autumn by a new author as good as Doris Buchanan Smith's A Taste of Blackberries."  "It blazed the way for the many other grief books that quickly followed, but few have approached the place of honor this one holds," wrote Jim Trelease in The Read-Aloud Handbook (Penguin, Sixth Edition, 2006).

A Taste of Blackberries won the Josette Frank Award, the Georgia Children's Book Award, and the Best Children's Book Prize of a translated work in the Netherlands (Zilveren Griffel).  It is an ALA Notable Children's Book, a Newbery Medal finalist, and has been translated into Dutch, Danish, French, Spanish and Japanese. In a review for the School Library Journal (2002), Ann Welton wrote that Smith's book is "rightfully viewed, along with Katherine Paterson's Bridge to Terabithia, 1977, as one of the seminal children's books on the subject of death."

Return to Bitter Creek, 1986, received the Parents' Choice Award, and was named a School Library Journal and Publishers Weekly Best Book of the Year. Last Was Lloyd, 1981, was a School Library Journal Best Book of the Year. Smith also wrote Voyages, 1980, The First Hard Times, 1983 and The Pennywhistle Tree, 1991, all named ALA Notable Children's Books by the American Library Association. Smith's last published work was Remember the Red Shouldered Hawk, in 1994.

Biography 
Doris Jean Buchanan was born June 1, 1934 in Washington, D.C. to parents Charles A. and Flora R. Buchanan.  At age two she began memorizing nursery rhymes her mother read to her and then inventing stories of her own.  At nine, her family moved from the nation's capital, to Atlanta, Georgia.  Noticing that she had a flair for storytelling, a sixth-grade teacher, Miss Pruitt (to whom A Taste of Blackberries would later be dedicated), asked Doris if she planned on becoming a writer one day.  The suggestion resonated and a "closet" writer was born.  The next year her parents divorced, leaving Doris and her brothers Bob and Jim to be reared by their mother.  While attending South Georgia College, Douglas, Georgia, Doris met R. Carroll Smith. Neither of them completed their courses, and in December 1954 they were married.  The Smiths settled in Brunswick, Georgia, where they raised four children of their own and cared for dozens of foster children, including one whom they reared from age 12 to adulthood.

After the author's youngest child entered public school, Smith began to focus on her writing, joining a writers group and attending writers conferences while honing her craft.  Smith's first completed novel was never published, but her second, A Taste of Blackberries, became a children's classic, which has remained in print since 1973.  Smith's marriage ended in divorce in 1977, and she remained single until meeting her second husband, Dr. William J. "Bill" Curtis, an Associate Professor of Education at the University of Colorado at Colorado Springs, while at a writer's conference in Hawaii.  They were married from 1990 until Curtis' death in 1997 from ALS (Amyotrophic lateral sclerosis, also known as Lou Gehrig's disease).  Doris Buchanan Smith succumbed to cancer in August, 2002.

Of her 17 books, only A Taste of Blackberries remains in print.  When Publishers Weekly asked children's editors to name a book they wish they had published, Deborah Brodie, former Executive Editor of Roaring Brook Press, named A Taste of Blackberries, remembering its impact; "Near the end of the book, when Jamie's mother accepts the basket of blackberries his friend has picked, she says, 'I'll bake a pie. And you be sure to come slam the door for me now and then.'  The slam of that door reverberates still."

References

External links 

 Doris Buchanan Smith Papers Hargrett Rare Book & Manuscript Library University of Georgia
 Doris Buchanan Smith Papers University of Minnesota
 Georgia Center for the Book Honors Doris Buchanan Smith
 New York Times Book Review March 4, 1990 of "Voyages"
 Zilveren Griffel - Dutch Award
 Zilveren Griffel Library Thing

1934 births
2002 deaths
20th-century American novelists
20th-century American women writers
American children's writers
American women novelists
Deaths from cancer in Florida
Writers from Washington, D.C.
American women children's writers